Circus Renz is a 1943 German drama film directed by Arthur Maria Rabenalt and starring René Deltgen, Paul Klinger and Angelika Hauff. It is a circus film, made as a deliberately escapist release at a time when the Second World War was starting to turn against Germany and its allies. The film takes its title from the real Circus Renz and is loosely based on the career of its founder Ernst Renz. It premiered at Berlin's UFA-Palast am Zoo in September 1943. It was a major commercial success.

It was made partly at the Babelsberg Studios in Berlin. The film's sets were designed by the art director Ernst H. Albrecht. Location shooting took place around Breslau in Silesia.

Cast

René Deltgen as Ernst Renz
Paul Klinger as Harms
Angelika Hauff as Bettina Althoff
Alice Treff as Frau von Grunau
Fritz Odemar as Herr von Grunau
Herbert Hübner as Circus Master Déjean
Willi Rose as Schwenz
Ernst Waldow as Polizeirat Bastian
Werner Pledath as The King
Rudolf Schündler as Litfaß
Gunnar Möller as Willi, baker's boy
 Charlotte Schultz as Gräfin Ziegenreuth
 Lotte Spira as Frau Bastian
 Gerhard Dammann as 	Konstabler Klemke
 Adolf Fischer as Artist
 Walter Steinweg as 	Artist
 Hildegard Grethe as 	Gräfin Geiersberg
 Kurt Hagen as Dostler, Kammerherr
 Hanns Waschatko as 	Adjutant
 Eduard Wenck as 	Torschreiber
 Klaus Pohl as 	Stefan - Bärenführer
 Hermann Pfeiffer as 	Schwiemel

References

Bibliography
 Bock, Hans-Michael & Bergfelder, Tim. The Concise CineGraph. Encyclopedia of German Cinema. Berghahn Books, 2009.
 Moeller, Felix. The Film Minister: Goebbels and the Cinema in the Third Reich. Edition Axel Menges, 2000.

External links

1940s historical drama films
German historical drama films
Films of Nazi Germany
Films directed by Arthur Maria Rabenalt
Circus films
Films set in the 1840s
Films set in the 1850s
German black-and-white films
Terra Film films
1940s German-language films
Films shot at Babelsberg Studios
Films set in Berlin
1940s German films